A phosphate phosphite is a chemical compound or salt that contains phosphate and phosphite anions (PO33- and PO43-). These are mixed anion compounds or mixed valence compounds. Some have third anions.

Phosphate phosphites frequently occur as metal organic framework (MOF) compounds which are of research interest for gas storage, detection or catalysis. In these phosphate and phosphite form bridging ligands to hard metal ions. Protonated amines are templates.

Naming 
An phosphate phosphite compound may also be called a phosphite phosphate.

Production 
Phosphate phosphite compounds are frequently produced by hydrothermal synthesis, in which a water solution of ingredients is enclosed in a sealed container and heated.  Phosphate may be reduced to phosphite or phosphite oxidised to phosphate in this process.

Properties 
On heating,

Related 
Related to these are the nitrite nitrates and arsenate arsenites.

List

References 

Phosphites
Phosphates
Mixed anion compounds